MLH may refer to:

 Major League Hacking, an organization for hackathon events
 Multi-line hunting, a method in telephony
 Major League Hockey, now Allan Cup Hockey
 Mill Hill (Lancashire) railway station, England, station code
 EuroAirport Basel-Mulhouse-Freiburg, France, IATA code
 Monoterpene epsilon-lactone hydrolase, an enzyme